The 2013–14 Prairie View A&M Panthers basketball team represented Prairie View A&M University during the 2013–14 NCAA Division I men's basketball season. The Panthers, led by eighth year head coach Byron Rimm II, played their home games at the William Nicks Building and were members of the Southwestern Athletic Conference. They finished the season 11–23, 6–12 in SWAC play to finish in eighth place. As the 8 seed, they won three games in four days to advance to the championship game of the SWAC tournament where they lost Texas Southern.

Before the season
Prairie View A&M was picked to finish fourth in the SWAC pre-season polls.

Roster

Schedule

|-
!colspan=9 style="background:#A020F0; color:#FFD700;"| Regular season

|-
!colspan=9 style="background:#A020F0; color:#FFD700;"| SWAC tournament

* The December 8 matchup with Dallas Christian was cancelled due to inclement weather in the North Texas area.

References

Prairie View A&M Panthers basketball seasons
Prairie View AandM